Evadale Independent School District is a public school district located in the community of Evadale, Texas (USA about 25 miles north of Beaumont. The district has two campuses - Evadale High School (Grades 9-12) and Evadale Elementary/Jr. High School (Grades PK-8)

In 2009, the school district was rated "recognized" by the Texas Education Agency. The district made news in June 2015 for refusing to change their Confederate Flag inspired crest despite pressure to do so.

References

External links
Evadale ISD

School districts in Jasper County, Texas